Joseph Bradley Story (born March 3, 1952 in Seattle, Washington) is an American former handball player who competed in the 1984 Summer Olympics and in the 1988 Summer Olympics.

References

1952 births
Living people
Sportspeople from Seattle
American male handball players
Olympic handball players of the United States
Handball players at the 1984 Summer Olympics
Handball players at the 1988 Summer Olympics
Willamette Bearcats
Medalists at the 1987 Pan American Games
Pan American Games gold medalists for the United States
Pan American Games medalists in handball